James Allen "Jim" Johnson was an American former track and field sprinter who specialized in the 400-meter dash. His greatest achievement came while representing his country at the 1963 Pan American Games, where he won gold medals in the individual 400 m and 4 × 400-meter relay, alongside Ollan Cassell, Richard Edmunds and Earl Young.

An African-American, he attended Norfolk State University and was part of the track team for the Norfolk State Spartans, helping them twice to the Central Intercollegiate Athletic Association title. He was posthumously inducted into the Norfolk State Sports Hall of Fame in 2009.

See also
List of Pan American Games medalists in athletics (men)

References

Year of birth missing
20th-century births
Year of death missing
American male sprinters
African-American male track and field athletes
Pan American Games track and field athletes for the United States
Pan American Games gold medalists for the United States
Athletes (track and field) at the 1963 Pan American Games
Norfolk State Spartans men's track and field athletes
Pan American Games medalists in athletics (track and field)
Medalists at the 1963 Pan American Games
20th-century African-American people